André Previn Plays Songs by Harold Arlen is a piano solo, jazz album by André Previn. It was intended as a homage to the composer Harold Arlen. It was recorded in May 1960. It was released in 1960 by Contemporary Records as M 3586.

Track listing
All pieces composed by Harold Arlen.
 "That Old Black Magic" - 4:35
 "Come Rain or Come Shine" - 4:37
 "My Shining Hour" - 3:42
 "Happiness Is a Thing Called Joe" - 4:31
 "A Sleepin' Bee" - 3:50
 "Stormy Weather" - 4:59
 "Over The Rainbow" - 4:23
 "Let's Fall In Love" - 4:52
 "For Every Man There's a Woman" - 5:26
 "Cocoanut Sweet" - 3:40

Personnel
André Previn - piano
Phil De Lancie - digital remastering (1991 re-release)

References

1960 albums
André Previn albums
Contemporary Records albums
Harold Arlen tribute albums
Grammy Award for Best Jazz Instrumental Album
Solo piano jazz albums